Nedsaja  is a village in Setomaa Parish, Võru County in southeastern Estonia.

References

 
Villages in Võru County